This article summarizes the highlights of professional and amateur golf in the year 2019.

Men's professional golf

Major championships
11–14 April: Masters Tournament – Tiger Woods won by one stroke over Dustin Johnson, Brooks Koepka, and Xander Schauffele. It was his fifth Masters championship, his 15th major championship, and his 81st PGA Tour win.	
16–19 May: PGA Championship – Brooks Koepka won by two strokes over Dustin Johnson for his second consecutive PGA Championship victory. He is the first player to simultaneously hold the last two titles of two different major championships (2017 and 2018 U.S. Open).
13–16 June: U.S. Open – Gary Woodland won by three strokes over two-time defending champion Koepka. It was his first major victory.
18–21 July: The Open Championship – Shane Lowry won by six strokes over Tommy Fleetwood for his first major championship.

World Golf Championships
21–24 February: WGC-Mexico Championship – Dustin Johnson won by five strokes over Rory McIlroy. It was his third WGC-Mexico Championship win and sixth WGC tournament win.
27–31 March: WGC-Dell Technologies Match Play – Kevin Kisner defeated Matt Kuchar, 3 & 2, in the championship match. It was his first WGC victory.
25–28 July: WGC-FedEx St. Jude Invitational – Brooks Koepka won by three strokes over Webb Simpson. It was his first WGC victory.
31 October – 3 November: WGC-HSBC Champions – Rory McIlroy won in a playoff over defending champion Xander Schauffele. McIlroy has now won three of the four WGC events.

FedEx Cup playoff events

8–11 August: The Northern Trust – Patrick Reed won by one stroke over Abraham Ancer and moved to second in the FedEx Cup rankings.
15–18 August: BMW Championship – Justin Thomas won by three strokes over Patrick Cantlay. His third round 61 set the course record. His win moved him top the top of the FedEx Cup rankings.
22–25 August: Tour Championship – Rory McIlroy won by four strokes over Xander Schauffele. McIlroy became the second two–time winner of the FedEx Cup.

Other leading PGA Tour events
14–17 March: The Players Championship – Rory McIlroy won by one stroke over Jim Furyk. He became the first golfer to win both the BMW PGA Championship and the Players Championship.

For a complete list of PGA Tour results see 2019 PGA Tour.

Leading European Tour events
19–22 September: BMW PGA Championship – Danny Willett won by three strokes over Jon Rahm.
21–24 November: DP World Tour Championship, Dubai – Jon Rahm won by one stroke over Tommy Fleetwood, also winning the Race to Dubai.

For a complete list of European Tour results see 2019 European Tour.

Team events
12–15 December: Presidents Cup – The U.S. team won, 16–14, for the eighth straight time.

Tour leaders
PGA Tour –  Brooks Koepka (US$9,684,006)
 This total does not include FedEx Cup bonuses.
European Tour –  Jon Rahm (5,898 points)
Japan Golf Tour –  Shugo Imahira (¥168,049,312)
Asian Tour –  Jazz Janewattananond (US$1,058,524)
PGA Tour of Australasia –  Ryan Fox (A$307,925)
Sunshine Tour –  J. C. Ritchie (R 2,162,387) – 2019–20 season

Awards
PGA Tour
FedEx Cup –  Rory McIlroy
PGA Player of the Year –  Brooks Koepka
Player of the Year (Jack Nicklaus Trophy) –  Rory McIlroy
Leading money winner –  Brooks Koepka
Vardon Trophy –  Rory McIlroy
Byron Nelson Award –  Rory McIlroy
Rookie of the Year (Arnold Palmer Award) –  Im Sung-jae
Payne Stewart Award –  Hale Irwin
European Tour
Golfer of the Year –  Jon Rahm
Rookie of the Year –  Robert MacIntyre
Korn Ferry Tour
Player of the Year –  Scottie Scheffler

Results from other tours
2019 Asian Tour
2019 PGA Tour of Australasia
2019 PGA Tour Canada
2019 Challenge Tour
2019 Japan Golf Tour
2019 PGA Tour Latinoamérica
2019–20 Sunshine Tour
2019 Korn Ferry Tour

Other happenings
 6 January: Three tours were added to the Official World Golf Ranking: All Thailand Golf Tour, Professional Golf Tour of India, and Abema TV Tour.
 6 January: Justin Rose regains the world number one ranking from Brooks Koepka.
 28 January: It was announced that the 2019 Players Championship would include a $12.5 million purse, "the biggest prize professional golf has ever seen for a single tournament."
 3 March: Dustin Johnson regains the world number one ranking from Justin Rose, one week after winning the WGC-Mexico Championship.
 7 April: Rose regains the world number one ranking from Johnson.
 14 April: Johnson returns to the number one ranking after finishing second at the Masters.
 19 May: Brooks Koepka returns to the world number one ranking after winning the PGA Championship.
 13 September: Kevin Chappell shot a 59 (11-under-par) in the second round of A Military Tribute at The Greenbrier. It was the 11th round under 60 in PGA Tour history.
 28 October: Tiger Woods wins the Zozo Championship to tied Sam Snead for most wins on the PGA Tour with 82.

Women's professional golf

LPGA majors
4–7 April: ANA Inspiration – Ko Jin-young won her first major by three strokes over Lee Mi-hyang.
30 May – 2 June: U.S. Women's Open – Lee Jeong-eun won her first major title by two strokes over a group of three players (Ryu So-yeon, Lexi Thompson, Angel Yin).
20–23 June: KPMG Women's PGA Championship – Australian Hannah Green won her first major (and first LPGA Tour event) by one stroke over defending champion Park Sung-hyun. It was the first wire-to-wire win at the Women's PGA Championship since Yani Tseng in 2011 and the first major win by an Australian since Karrie Webb at the 2006 Kraft Nabisco Championship.
25–28 July: The Evian Championship – Ko Jin-young won by two strokes over Shanshan Feng, Kim Hyo-joo, and Jennifer Kupcho. It was her second major championship of the year.
1–4 August: Women's British Open – Hinako Shibuno, of Japan, playing for the first time outside of her home country and in her first major, won by one stroke over American Lizette Salas.

Additional LPGA Tour events
21–24 November: CME Group Tour Championship – Kim Sei-young won by one stroke over Charley Hull.

For a complete list of LPGA Tour results, see 2019 LPGA Tour.
For a complete list of Ladies European Tour results see 2019 Ladies European Tour.

Team events
13–15 September: Solheim Cup – Team Europe won the Cup with a 14½–13½ victory over Team USA.

Money list leaders
LPGA Tour –  Ko Jin-young ($2,773,894)
LPGA of Japan Tour –  Ai Suzuki (¥160,189,665)
Ladies European Tour –  Esther Henseleit (743.06 points)
LPGA of Korea Tour –  Choi Hye-jin (₩1,207,162,636)
ALPG Tour –  Sarah Kemp (A$147,118, 2018/19 season)
Symetra Tour –  Perrine Delacour (US$125,042)

Other tour results
2019 ALPG Tour
2019 LPGA of Japan Tour
2019 LPGA of Korea Tour
2019 Symetra Tour

Other happenings
 4 March: Park Sung-hyun regains the world number one ranking from Ariya Jutanugarn after winning the HSBC Women's World Championship.
 8 April: Ko Jin-young takes the world number one ranking after winning the ANA Inspiration.
 1 July: Park regains the world number one ranking from Ko after winning the Walmart NW Arkansas Championship.
 29 July: Ko Jin-young regains the world number one ranking after winning the Evian Championship.

Senior men's professional golf

Senior majors
9–12 May: Regions Tradition – Steve Stricker won by six strokes over Billy Andrade, Paul Goydos, and David Toms. It is his first major championship.
23–26 May: Senior PGA Championship – Ken Tanigawa won his first major by one stroke over Scott McCarron.
27–30 June: U.S. Senior Open  – Steve Stricker, playing in his first U.S. Senior Open, won by six strokes over Jerry Kelly and David Toms. It is his second major championship.
11–14 July: Senior Players Championship – Retief Goosen won his first senior major by two strokes over Jay Haas and Tim Petrovic.
25–28 July: Senior Open Championship – Bernhard Langer won by two strokes over Paul Broadhurst. It was his fourth Senior Open championship, his 11th senior major championship, and his 40th PGA Tour Champions win.

Charles Schwab Cup playoff events
18–20 October: Dominion Charity Classic – Miguel Ángel Jiménez won by two strokes over Tommy Tolles.
1–3 November: Invesco QQQ Championship – Colin Montgomerie won in a playoff over Bernhard Langer.
7–10 November: Charles Schwab Cup Championship – Jeff Maggert won in a playoff over Retief Goosen.

Full results
2019 PGA Tour Champions season
2019 European Senior Tour

Money list leaders
PGA Tour Champions –  Scott McCarron (US$2,534,090)
European Senior Tour –  Phillip Price (2887.8 points)

Awards
PGA Tour Champions
Charles Schwab Cup –  Scott McCarron
Player of the Year –  Scott McCarron
Rookie of the Year –  Retief Goosen
Leading money winner (Arnold Palmer Award) –  Scott McCarron
Lowest stroke average (Byron Nelson Award) –  Retief Goosen

Senior women's professional golf
Senior majors
16–19 May: U.S. Senior Women's Open – Helen Alfredsson won her first senior major by two strokes over Juli Inkster and Trish Johnson.
14–16 October: Senior LPGA Championship – Helen Alfredsson won by three strokes over Juli Inkster, completing the second straight senior women's Grand Slam after Laura Davies' inaugural in 2018.

Amateur golf
17–20 January: Latin America Amateur Championship – Álvaro Ortiz won by two strokes over Luis Gagne. Ortiz had finished runner-up in the previous two Latin America Amateurs.
3–6 April: Augusta National Women's Amateur – Jennifer Kupcho won the inaugural event.
17–22 May: NCAA Division I Women's Golf Championships – María Fassi (Arkansas) took the individual title and Duke captured their seventh team title.
24–29 May: NCAA Division I Men's Golf Championships – Matthew Wolff (Oklahoma State) won the individual title and Stanford won its 9th team title.
11–15 June: The Womens Amateur Championship – Emily Toy defeated Amelia Garvey, 1 up in the final.
17–22 June: The Amateur Championship – James Sugrue defeated Euan Walker, 2 up, in the final.
26–29 June: European Amateur – Matti Schmid wins by three strokes over Euan Walker.
24–27 July: European Ladies Amateur Championship – Alice Hewson won in a playoff over Krista Junkkari.
5–11 August: U.S. Women's Amateur – Gabriela Ruffels became the first Australian to win the U.S. Women's Amateur with a 1 up victory over Albane Valenzuela.
12–18 August: U.S. Amateur – Andy Ogletree defeated John Augenstein, 2 and 1, in the final.
7–8 September: Walker Cup – The United States team won, 15½–10½.
26–29 September: Asia-Pacific Amateur Championship – Lin Yuxin of China won his second Asia-Pacific Amateur.

Golf in multi-sport events
10–13 July: Pacific Games – New Caledonia swept the gold medals: men's individual (Dylan Benoit), women's individual (Emilie Ricaud), men's team and women's team.
8–11 August: Pan American Games – Fabrizio Zanotti of Paraguay took the men's gold medal in a playoff, American amateur Emilia Migliaccio took the women's gold medal and the American team (all amateurs) took the mixed team gold medal.
2–6 December: South Asian Games – Nepal took the men's individual (Subash Tamang) and team gold medals while Sri Lanka took the women's individual (Grace Yataeara) and team gold medals.
4–7 December: Southeast Asian Games – James Leow Kwang Aik of Singapore took the men's individual gold medal while Thailand won men's team gold. The Philippines took the women's gold medals with Bianca Pagdanganan taking the individual title.

Deaths
1 February – Alice Dye (born 1927), American amateur golfer and golf course designer.
15 February – Gene Littler (born 1930), American professional golfer, U.S. Open winner (1961), member World Golf Hall of Fame.
7 March – Dan Jenkins (born 1928), American author and sportswriter and member of the World Golf Hall of Fame.
7 April – Arie Irawan (born 1990), Malaysian professional golfer who died during a PGA Tour China event.
9 April – Marilynn Smith (born 1929), American professional golfer, co-founder of LPGA, member of World Golf Hall of Fame.
3 June – Larry Beck (born 1939), American professional golfer, winner of the 1957 U.S. Junior Amateur.
5 June – Peter Toogood (born 1930), Australian amateur golfer, 1954 Australian Amateur winner.
15 July – Margaret Todd (born 1918), Canadian amateur golfer and member of the Canadian Golf Hall of Fame.
29 July – Mário Gonzalez (born 1922), Brazilian professional golfer who won the Brazil Open a record eight times.
1 August – Gordon Brand Jnr (born 1958), Scottish golfer who won eight times on the European Tour.
9 September – Brian Barnes (born 1945), Scottish professional golfer who won nine times on the European Tour.
6 November – Pat O'Sullivan (born 1926), American amateur golfer and winner of the 1951 Titleholders Championship.
6 December – Jo Ann Washam (born 1950), American professional golfer who won three times on the LPGA Tour.
31 December – Ernie Jones (born 1932), Irish professional golfer.
31 December – J. L. Lewis (born 1960), American professional golfer who won twice on the PGA Tour.

Table of results
This table summarizes all the results referred to above in date order.

References

 
2019